Nikola Kalinić (born 5 January 1988) is a Croatian professional footballer who plays as a striker for Croatian club Hajduk Split.

Kalinić began his career with Hajduk Split in his native Croatia before moving to English club Blackburn Rovers for £6 million in 2009. After scoring rarely in two Premier League seasons, he left for Ukrainian side Dnipro, helping them reach the 2015 UEFA Europa League Final. He then played in Serie A for Fiorentina and AC Milan, before signing for Spanish club Atletico Madrid ahead of the 2018–19 season, winning the 2018 UEFA Super Cup.

Kalinić made his debut for Croatia in 2008 and represented the nation at three UEFA European Championships. He was part of their side that came runners-up at the 2018 FIFA World Cup but was sent home after one game.

Club career

Early career
Born in Split, Kalinić began his playing career at Hajduk Split. He made his Prva HNL debut in the 2005–06 season at age 17. On 1 August 2006, he was sent on loan to Pula Staro Češko to receive more first-team action. In his loan time at Pula, he had a slow but fair start considering his young age. Despite not playing all too regularly in a short single season with them, he still managed to adapt and find goalscoring form, scoring 3 goals in 12 league appearances.

Kalinić's first goals in the Prva HNL came in the 2–0 victory against Kamen Ingrad on 23 September 2006 as he scored a brace to give his side the victory. Upon ending his short time at Pula, manager Krunoslav Jurčić was largely impressed with him, stating he could become the next Zlatan Ibrahimović.

Despite his intentions to stay at Pula, Kalinić returned to Hajduk and was immediately sent out on loan to Šibenik, where he saw occasional first team action and immediately impressed with all-round performances and a goal-scoring ability, scoring three goals in eight appearances.

Hajduk Split
After clearly showing the ability to adapt well to the Croatian league, Kalinić returned to Hajduk and immediately saw plenty of first team action. He made his returning debut against Cibalia as a substitute, then secured his first start in the squad during the 2–1 victory against Osijek at the Poljud Stadium. His 17 league goals in his first season with Hajduk was only beaten by league topscorer Želimir Terkeš, who scored 21 goals. However, it was a great achievement for the youngster, who had initially set a target of scoring 15 goals. He finished the 2007–08 season in fifth place with Hajduk in the league, also helping them reach the final of the Croatian Cup in the same season. In all competitions, he ended the year with 26 goals, receiving the coveted Swan d'or Award from the Croatian Press Association.

Kalinić began the next season by scoring the second goal in Hajduk's 0–4 away victory against Maltese side Birkirara, thus advancing them to the next round of qualification for the 2008–09 UEFA Cup. In Hajduk's derby match over league rivals Dinamo Zagreb, Kalinić scored the first goal with a penalty kick. Hajduk went on to win the match 2–0 and overtake Dinamo in the league table.

Kalinić went for a one-week trial at English club Portsmouth in late July 2009, whereupon a fee thought to be in the region of £6 million was agreed between Hajduk and Portsmouth. However, the move fell through due to financial reasons. On 31 July 2009, Kalinić was heavily linked with another Premier League club, Blackburn Rovers. Later that day, the player's agent confirmed Kalinić had been at Blackburn's ground talking to the club on the 30th and 31st with regard to the deal to take the player to Ewood Park. The player's agent also confirmed that the fee was €7 million should the deal be completed; the contract had been agreed and his client was due to sign for the club. The player also made light that the Lancashire-based club expected "big things" from the highly rated Croat.

On 1 August 2009, the move stepped closer when Hajduk club president Mate Peroš confirmed Blackburn had an offer accepted by the club, the best from any club. He also said, "Very quickly we finished the talks with the club [Blackburn]."

Blackburn Rovers
On 3 August 2009, Kalinić signed for Blackburn Rovers on a four-year deal. The transfer fee is believed to be in the region of £6 million. One week later, Kalinić was successfully awarded a work permit and officially signed for the club. However, his debut was delayed as he had to return from his homeland to collect his permit, meaning he was not officially registered in time for Rovers' opening match of the season, against Manchester City. On 13 August, he was officially confirmed as a Blackburn player and was assigned the number 22 jersey for the 2009–10 season, making his debut against Sunderland nine days later. 

On 27 October, Kalinić scored his first goal for Blackburn against Peterborough United in the League Cup. He scored his second goal in the quarter-final of the competition against Chelsea, but missed a penalty in the shootout which Blackburn went on to win regardless. His good cup form continued in January, scoring three goals against Aston Villa - one in the FA Cup and then the two opening goals in the second leg of the League Cup semi-final, which ended 6-4 to Villa. Kalinić scored his first Premier League goal against Wigan Athletic with a header from a resultant corner taken by Morten Gamst Pedersen in the 76th minute of a 2–1 victory. 

He was handed the number nine shirt by manager Sam Allardyce at the beginning of the new Premier League campaign. Despite missing much of pre-season, Kalinić started the 2010–11 season well, scoring the only goal in Blackburn's opening day victory over Everton at Ewood Park on 14 August. On 28 December 2010, he netted his first brace in Blackburn colours in their 1–3 away win over West Bromwich Albion at The Hawthorns, though he was later sent off in this game. After Sam Allardyce was sacked as Blackburn manager, Kalinić fell out of favor with Blackburn's newly appointed manager Steve Kean.

Dnipro

On 11 August 2011, Kalinić signed for Dnipro of the Ukrainian Premier League for an undisclosed fee. He made his debut for the club on 13 August 2011 as a second-half substitute against league champions Shakhtar Donetsk in a 3–1 defeat. He marked his first appearance for the club with a goal but was red carded for elbowing just two minutes after scoring. Kalinić netted ten goals in all competitions in both his first and second seasons with the Ukrainian side.

On 27 May 2015, Kalinić opened the scoring with a header in the Europa League Final against holders Sevilla in Warsaw, although his team eventually lost 2–3. Kalinić scored six other goals in his sides run to the Europa League final and another 12 league goals, taking his tally for the 2014–15 season to 19, the highest of his career.

Fiorentina
In August 2015, Kalinić signed a contract with Fiorentina. The fee was reported to be a figure close to €5 million. His Serie A debut came in a 2–0 win over AC Milan, and he then scored the first goal against Bologna in a match which also ended 2–0. On 27 September, Kalinić scored a hat-trick away against Inter Milan in a 4–1 victory. Due to this win, Fiorentina reached the top of Serie A for the first time since 1998–99. Eight weeks later, he scored twice in a game against Empoli, the double earning Fiorentina a 2–2 draw.

Another 11 months later, he scored another hat-trick against Cagliari, although his side was beaten 5–3. During this season (on 15 April 2017), he was sent off for the first time, against Empoli. The referee showed him the red card for his protests at the final whistle. Tianjin Quanjian made an offer of €50 million for Kalinić which was accepted by Fiorentina, but the offer was turned down by the player.

At the start of 2017–18 season, Kalinić's number 9 shirt was given to Giovanni Simeone, with Kalinić assigned the number 99 shirt instead.

Loan to AC Milan
On 22 August 2017, Kalinić joined AC Milan on loan with an obligation to purchase for a reported fee of about €25 million. He chose to wear the number 7 shirt, as it was vacant. He made his debut in a 2–1 victory at the San Siro against Cagliari on 27 August, coming on as a substitute in the 78th minute. On 17 September, he scored a brace in his first start for Milan in Serie A against Udinese as Milan won 2–1.

Atlético Madrid
On 9 August 2018, Atlético Madrid signed Kalinić on a three-year contract. Six days later, he was an unused substitute as they defeated rivals Real Madrid to win the 2018 UEFA Super Cup in Tallinn.

He made his La Liga debut in a 0–2 loss against Celta Vigo on 1 September, coming on as a substitute in the 56th minute. On 8 December 2018, he started the game against Alaves in place of the injured Diego Costa and scored his team's first goal in an eventual 3-0 home win, by tapping in (in fact from the lower part of his stomach) a curling cross from Santiago Arias, which was also his first league goal of the campaign.

He scored his first goal for the club with a powerful header in the second half to help his team in a 5-0 aggregate win in the second leg of the Round of 32 tie in the season's Copa del Rey clash against fourth tier Sant Andreu.

Loan to Roma
On 2 September 2019, Kalinić joined A.S. Roma on a season-long loan deal which included an optional purchase clause. Roma chose not to activate the clause and Kalinić returned to Atlético at the end of the season.

Hellas Verona
On 5 October 2020, Kalinić joined Hellas Verona until 2022.

Return to Hajduk
On 6 February 2022, Kalinić returned to Hajduk Split.

International career
Kalinić was a key player in the Croatia national under-21 team during his youth playing years, also representing his country at the under-17 and -19 level. He first made a name for himself at international level at age 17 during the 2005 UEFA European Under-17 Championship when he finished the campaign as the top scorer with 11 goals. At the under-19 level, he managed another five goals during his side's preliminary round of the same tournament. He also scored a hat-trick against Lithuania in Croatia's 3–0 victory, which secured them a spot in the next elite round of the UEFA European Under-19 Championship in 2006.

Initially supposed to be called up by head coach Slaven Bilić for the few remaining qualifying matches of UEFA Euro 2008, Kalinić missed the chance due to injury and was instead replaced by Mario Mandžukić. However, his constant impressive abilities earned him a place in Croatia's final squad for Euro 2008. He made his first appearance for the senior national team on 24 May 2008, coming on as a substitute in the 62nd minute of Croatia's 1–0 friendly win against Moldova. He went on to make his first competitive appearance for his national side at Euro 2008 in Croatia's final group match against Poland, coming on as a substitute for goalscorer Ivan Klasnić in the 1–0 victory.

On 17 November 2010, Kalinić scored his first international goal, scoring the third goal in Croatia's 3–0 win at home to Malta in the Euro 2012 qualifiers. On 9 February 2011, he scored a brace in a 4–2 victory over the Czech Republic in an international friendly game.

In June 2012, Kalinić replaced the injured Ivica Olić in Croatia's squad for Euro 2012 and remained an unused substitute in the tournament.

Kalinić missed the 2014 World Cup, but received a call-up back for a friendly against Argentina in 2014, although he remained an unused substitute.

In 2015, Kalinić returned to the international level. At Euro 2016, he scored a goal and assisted in a 2–1 victory in a group stage match against defending champions Spain.

On 4 June 2018, Kalinić was named in Croatia's 23-man squad for the 2018 FIFA World Cup in Russia. On the fifth day of the tournament, he was sent home after refusing to come on as a late substitute during Croatia's first game of the competition against Nigeria, claiming to have a back injury, ending his international career. Kalinić had refused to play for the same reason previously during a friendly match against Brazil as well as during the previous day's training session. Following the conclusion of the tournament, Kalinić was awarded a silver medal for being part of the Croatian team, but refused to accept it.

Style of play
Nicknamed condor, Kalinić is usually deployed as an out-and-out striker, and is mainly known for his consistent goalscoring ability, courtesy of his composure in front of goal and clinical finishing inside the box. However, he also possesses good technique and link-up play, which along with his size and selfless team-play, enables him to hold up the ball with his back to goal, play off of other players, and create chances for teammates; as such he is capable of playing anywhere along the front line, and has also been used as a second striker on occasion, or as a false 9. His movement off the ball allows him to provide depth to his team, exploit gaps in the opposing defenice, or create space for his teammates with his attacking runs. A tall and physically strong player, with good elevation, he is also known for his ability in the air, which makes him a threat on set pieces. Although he is not gifted with significant pace, he is also a mobile player, who is known for his defensive work-rate off the ball when possession is lost, as well as his willingness to track back and press opponents.

Career statistics

Club

International

Scores and results list Croatia's goal tally first, score column indicates score after each Kalinić goal

Honours
Atlético Madrid
UEFA Super Cup: 2018

Croatia
FIFA World Cup runner-up: 2018

Individual
Hope of the Year: 2007
Prva HNL Player of the Year: 2008
UEFA Europa League Team of the Group Stage: 2016–17

Notes

References

External links

Nikola Kalinić profile at the Blackburn Rovers website

Premier League profile
 

1988 births
Living people
People from Solin
Croatian footballers
Association football forwards
HNK Hajduk Split players
NK Istra 1961 players
HNK Šibenik players
Blackburn Rovers F.C. players
FC Dnipro players
ACF Fiorentina players
A.C. Milan players
Atlético Madrid footballers
A.S. Roma players
Hellas Verona F.C. players
Croatian Football League players
Premier League players
Ukrainian Premier League players
Serie A players
La Liga players
Croatia youth international footballers
Croatia under-21 international footballers
Croatia international footballers
UEFA Euro 2008 players
UEFA Euro 2012 players
UEFA Euro 2016 players
2018 FIFA World Cup players
Croatian expatriate footballers
Expatriate footballers in England
Expatriate footballers in Italy
Expatriate footballers in Spain
Expatriate footballers in Ukraine
Croatian expatriate sportspeople in England
Croatian expatriate sportspeople in Italy
Croatian expatriate sportspeople in Spain
Croatian expatriate sportspeople in Ukraine